Megatrigoniidae  is an extinct family of fossil saltwater clams, marine bivalve molluscs in the subclass Palaeoheterodonta. This family of bivalves is known in the fossil record from the Jurassic period, Tithonian age, to the Cretaceous period, Maastrichtian age. Species in this family were facultatively mobile infaunal suspension feeders.

Subfamilies and genera
Subfamilies and genera within the family Megatrigoniidae:
Megatrigoniinae van Hoepen 1929
Apiotrigonia Cox 1952
 Pterotrigoniinae van Hoepen 1929
 Paulckella Cooper et al. 1989
 Pterotrigonia van Hoepen 1929

Distribution
Fossils of this family have been found in Jurassic of Antarctica, Chile, India and in Cretaceous of Angola, Antarctica, Argentina, Austria, Chile, Colombia, Cuba, Ecuador, Egypt, France, Hungary, Italy, Japan, Libya, Madagascar, Mexico, Mozambique, New Zealand, Oman, Peru, Portugal, Serbia and Montenegro, South Africa, Spain, Trinidad and Tobago, Russia, Ukraine, United Arab Emirates, United Kingdom, United States and Yemen.

References
Paleobiology Database

Prehistoric bivalve families
Jurassic first appearances
Cretaceous extinctions
Trigoniida
Fossils of Serbia